Lee Fu-hsing (born 14 May 1946) is a Taiwanese politician. He served on the Kaohsiung City Council between 1990 and 2005. He was a member of the Legislative Yuan from 2005 to 2012.

Education
Lee attended the National Taichung University of Science and Technology, but received most of his post-secondary education in Japan. He earned an bachelor's degree in English from the Tokyo University of Foreign Studies, a master's degree in education from Tokyo Gakugei University, and completed some doctoral work at Kyushu University.

Political career
Lee was first elected to the Kaohsiung City Council in 1989, winning reelection in 1993, 1997, and 2001. He ran for a seat on the Legislative Yuan in 2004, and won, stepping down from the city council in 2005 to enter the legislature. Lee registered his candidacy for the 2006 Kaohsiung mayoral election, but the Kuomintang eventually selected  as its candidate. Lee won reelection to the legislature in 2008 and left at the end of his second term in 2012.

References

1946 births
Living people
Kaohsiung Members of the Legislative Yuan
Members of the 6th Legislative Yuan
Members of the 7th Legislative Yuan
Kaohsiung City Councilors
Kuomintang Members of the Legislative Yuan in Taiwan
Tokyo University of Foreign Studies alumni
Tokyo Gakugei University alumni
Kyushu University alumni